The Minister for Housing is an Australian Government cabinet position which is currently held by Julie Collins following the swearing in of the full Albanese ministry on 1 June 2022.

In the Government of Australia, the minister administers this portfolio through the Department of Social Services.

The first Minister for Housing was Les Bury, appointed in 1963, although there were Ministers in charge of War Service Homes from 1932 to 1938 and 1941 to 1945. In 1945, Bert Lazzarini was appointed Minister for Works and Housing and this title continued until 1952, when Wilfrid Kent Hughes became Minister for Works. No minister included "works" or "construction" in his portfolio after Stewart West lost this title in 1987, partly reflecting the progressive outsourcing of the Commonwealth's construction activities and even ownership of assets. The Howard government had no Minister of Housing, partly reflecting the decline of the significance of the commonwealth-state housing agreements as a means of providing new housing since the post-war years.

List of Ministers for Housing
The following individuals have been appointed as Minister for Housing, or any of its precedent titles:

Notes
 Whitlam was one of a two-man ministry consisting of himself and Lance Barnard for two weeks until the full ministry was announced.

List of assistant ministers
The following individuals have been appointed as Assistant Minister for Community Housing, Homelessness and Community Services, or any of its precedent titles:

References

External links
 

Housing